Grant Valley is a valley between the Communication Heights and Mount Ash in the Darwin Mountains of Antarctica. A lobe of ice from Hatherton Glacier occupies the mouth of the valley. It was named after Bettie Kathryn Grant, Information Systems Supervisor at South Pole Station. She made 11 deployments to Antarctica, 1990–2001, the last 10 to South Pole Station where she wintered, 1993.

References

Valleys of Oates Land